César Augusto Obando Villeda, nicknamed El Nene, (born 26 October 1969) is a retired Honduran professional football player who is considered one of the best players ever in Honduras but a serious injury cut his career early.

Club career
The diminutive Obando played in the Liga Nacional de Fútbol de Honduras for F.C. Motagua, C.D. Victoria and Real C.D. España. He also played abroad with Mexican outfit Correcaminos UAT, with fellow Honduran Eugenio Dolmo Flores at Peruvian side Universitario and in Costa Rica with Cartaginés. At Cartaginés, he played alongside compatriots Arnold Cruz and Christian Santamaría but was released in February 2003.

He played in the 1994 Copa Libertadores with Universitario, where the club were eliminated by Independiente Medellín in the knock-out stages. In 1992, he was named World's Top Goal Scorer of the Year by the IFFHS.

His last game as a professional player in the Honduran league was on 21 May 2002 with his team F.C. Motagua defeating C.D. Olimpia 2 - 1. He is known for his powerful right footed shot. He scored 23 league goals for Motagua.

International career
Obando made his debut for Honduras in a May 1991 UNCAF Nations Cup match against Panama and has earned a total of 33 caps, scoring 15 goals. He has represented his country in 7 FIFA World Cup qualification matches and played at the 1991 UNCAF Nations Cup.

His final international was a March 2002 friendly match against the United States.

International goals
Scores and results list Honduras' goal tally first.

Managerial career
Obando was named Motagua's reserves coach in 2013.

He was then made coach of a bilingual school called International School of Tegucigalpa (IST) at the capital of Honduras.

References

External links

1969 births
Living people
Sportspeople from Tegucigalpa
Association football midfielders
Honduran footballers
Honduras international footballers
F.C. Motagua players
Club Universitario de Deportes footballers
Correcaminos UAT footballers
C.S. Cartaginés players
C.D.S. Vida players
C.D. Victoria players
Real C.D. España players
F.C. Motagua managers
Honduran expatriate footballers
Expatriate footballers in Peru
Expatriate footballers in Mexico
Expatriate footballers in Costa Rica
Honduran expatriate sportspeople in Mexico
Honduran expatriate sportspeople in Peru
Honduran expatriate sportspeople in Costa Rica
Liga Nacional de Fútbol Profesional de Honduras players
Liga MX players